Volema is a genus of sea snails, marine gastropod molluscs in the family Melongenidae, the crown conches and their allies.

Species
Species within the genus Volema include:
 Volema myristica Röding, 1798
 Volema paradisiaca Röding, 1798 
 Volema pyrum (Gmelin, 1791)
Species brought into synonymy 
 Volema alouina Röding, 1798 : synonym of Thais (Mancinella) alouina (Röding, 1798)
 Volema glacialis Röding, 1798 : synonym of Thais (Mancinella) alouina (Röding, 1798)
 Volema pheata Röding, 1798 : synonym of Rapana bezoar (Linnaeus, 1767)

References

External links

Melongenidae